The Marlin No. 20 is a slide-action .22 caliber rifle with an octagonal barrel and tubular magazine, bearing patents of August 12, 1890 through November 29, 1904, produced by the Marlin Firearms Co. of New Haven, Connecticut.

It is not the same as the Glenfield Model 20 (Marlin 780).  The Model 20 is a bolt-action rifle that fires primarily the .22LR rimfire cartridge, but also the .22 short, and the obsolete .22 long (all rimfire cartridges, and can all be fired in the same gun). Produced by the Marlin Firearms Company of North Haven, Connecticut, it was in production from 1960 to 1966.

Uses 
The Model 20 is well-suited for small-game hunting and vermin control, as well as a target practice gun.

Bolt-action rifles of the United States
Marlin Firearms Company firearms
.22 LR rifles